The 1942 Georgia Tech Yellow Jackets football team was an American football team that represented the  Georgia Institute of Technology (Georgia Tech) in the Southeastern Conference (SEC) during the 1942 college football season. In their 23rd season under head coach William Alexander, the Yellow Jacket won the first nine games of the season, before losing its final two games, including a loss to Texas in the 1943 Cotton Bowl. They were ranked No. 5 in the AP poll.

Schedule

References

Georgia Tech
Georgia Tech Yellow Jackets football seasons
Georgia Tech Yellow Jackets football